Holika Dahan, rendered Holika Dahanam in Sanskrit, is a Hindu occasion that celebrates the legend Holika and Prahalad. Holika thought that she could use her boon(that fire cannot destroy her) to kill her nephew Prahlad and sat with him in the bonfire. However, she got burnt herself and Prahlad was saved. It precedes the occasion of Holi, the festival of colours, which celebrates the spring season. 

What is Holi and why is it celebrated?

Holi celebrates the arrival of Spring (season) in India, the end of winter, the blossoming of love and for many, it is a festive day to meet others, play and laugh, forget and forgive, and repair broken relationships. The festival is also an invocation for a good spring harvest season.

In South India, this occasion is called Kama Dahanam, and is associated with the legend of Shiva burning Kamadeva with his third eye to ashes. Pantomimes of Kamadeva are performed on this occasion in rural Tamil Nadu, and his effigies are burnt.

Significance

Days before the festival of Holi, people start gathering wood and combustible materials for the bonfire in parks, community centers, near temples, and other open spaces. Inside homes, people stock up on color pigments, food, party drinks and festive seasonal foods such as gujiya, mathri, malpuas, and other regional delicacies.
The night before Holi, pyres are burnt in North India, Nepal, and parts of South India in keeping with this tradition. 

In some parts of North India the day is called Holika Dahan. while in other parts like Purvanchal (eastern Uttar Pradesh and western Bihar) as well as Terai regions of Nepal it is called Sammat Jaarna. Bonfires are burnt on the eve of Holi to symbolise the burning of Holika.

References

 
Hindu festivals
Articles containing video clips
Hindu festivals in India
Religious festivals in India
Traditions involving fire